The badminton men's doubles tournament at the 2012 Olympic Games in London took place from 28 July to 5 August at Wembley Arena.

The draw was held on 23 July 2012. Thirty-two players from 14 nations competed in the event. China's Cai Yun and Fu Haifeng won the gold medal.

Competition format
The tournament started with a group phase round-robin followed by a knockout stage.

Seeds

  (gold Medallists)
  (bronze Medallists)
  (silver Medallists)
  (group stage)

Results

Group stage

Group A

Group B

1 Cwalina / Łogosz retired from the competition after Łogosz pulled an Achillies tendon during the third set of the first match.

Group C

Group D

Finals

References

External links
Results at tournamentsoftware.com

Badminton at the 2012 Summer Olympics
Men's events at the 2012 Summer Olympics